Taeniotes similis is a species of beetle in the family Cerambycidae. It was discovered and described by Dillon and Dillon in 1941. It is known from Peru, Colombia, and Ecuador.

References

similis
Beetles described in 1941